The 2013–14 Dynamo Dresden season was the 64th season in the club's football history. In 2013–14 the club played in the 2. Fußball-Bundesliga, the second tier of German football. It was the clubs second consecutive season in this league, having played at this level since 2011–12, after winning promotion from the 3. Liga in 2011.

The club were suspended from the 2013–14 edition of the DFB-Pokal, due to crowd trouble in the previous season's competition.

Review and events

Dynamo began the season slowly, failing to win any of their first nine matches of the season. This run cost coach Peter Pacult his job, he was sacked in August and replaced by Olaf Janßen. Jansen was unable to save the club from relegation – they finished 17th, having been leapfrogged into this position by Arminia Bielefeld after a dramatic 3–2 home defeat on the last day of the season. Dynamo had won just five games all season, and drawn seventeen.

Matches

Legend

2. Bundesliga

Squad

Transfers

Summer

In:

Out:

Winter

In:

Out:

Sources

External links
 2012–13 Dynamo Dresden season at Weltfussball.de 
 2012–13 Dynamo Dresden season at kicker.de 
 2013–14 Dynamo Dresden season at Fussballdaten.de 

Dynamo Dresden
Dynamo Dresden seasons